Joseph Bradbury may refer to:

 Joe Bradbury, English rugby league footballer
 Joseph Perry Bradbury (1838–1915), American politician and judge in Ohio